Liuva II ( 584 – June/July 603), son of Reccared I and possibly Baddo, was Visigothic King of Hispania, Septimania and Galicia from 601 to 603.  He succeeded Reccared I at only eighteen years of age.

Reign
In the spring of 602, the Goth Witteric, one of the conspirators with Sunna de Mérida to reestablish Arianism in 589, was given command of the army to repulse the Byzantines. From his position of power at the head of the army, he surrounded himself with people in his confidence. When it came time to expel the Byzantines, Witteric instead used his troops to strike at the king in the spring of 603. Invading the royal palace, and deposing the young king, he counted on the support of a faction of nobles in opposition to the dynasty of Leovigild. Witteric cut off the king's right hand, punishment that prevented him from being king, and later had him condemned to death and executed in the summer of 603.

References

7th-century Visigothic monarchs
603 deaths
Year of birth unknown
Executed monarchs